Mariya Aleksandrovna Lasitskene (born 14 January 1993) is a Russian athlete who specialises in the high jump. She is the 2020 Olympic champion and three-time world champion (2015, 2017 and 2019). With her victory in Tokyo, Lasitskene became the fourth female high jumper in history (after Stefka Kostadinova, Heike Henkel & Anna Chicherova) to win gold at both the Olympic Games and the World Championships.

Career
Lasitskene won her first international medal at the 2009 World Youth Championships in Athletics, where she cleared a personal best of 1.85 m to take the silver medal behind Italian Alessia Trost. She was also the silver medallist at the 2009 European Youth Olympic Festival and 2009 Gymnasiade.

In the inaugural 2010 Summer Youth Olympics, Lasitskene won a gold medal in the girls' high jump with a clearance of 1.89 m, ahead of Alessia Trost.

She started her 2011 season with a major scalp in the form of Yelena Slesarenko, who she defeated with an indoor best jump of 1.90 m. A greater effort soon followed on the Moravia High Jump Tour meet in Třinec, as she cleared 1.97 m to claim the world junior indoor best which Desislava Aleksandrova had held since 1994.

Lasitskene has also won an ex-aequo gold medal at the 2014 World Indoor Championships and a silver at the 2014 European Championships. At the 2015 European Indoor Championships she won gold as she did later at the 2015 World Championships with a personal best of 2.01 m.

Following her world championships win, she was considered a favorite to win the Olympic title at the 2016 Summer Olympics in Rio de Janeiro. However, she was barred from competing when the CAS upheld their decision to ban the Russian Track and Field Federation from the Games for systematic doping. At a domestic competition she jumped a height of 2.00 m—a height that would have easily won gold in Rio. In April 2017, her application to compete as a neutral athlete until Russia is reinstated was accepted; this allows Lasitskene to resume competition despite the Federation's ban. Her first competition back was the third Diamond League in the series at Eugene. She won the women's high jump with a personal best and world leading height of 2.03 m.

She improved to 2.04 m on 11 June 2017 in Hengelo. On 6 July 2017, she set a new personal best at the Diamond League in Lausanne with a height of 2.06 m, a Diamond League record. She followed up her strong performances in the Diamond League competitions by defending her world title later in London on 12 August 2017 with a height of 2.03 m.

Lasitskene wrote on Instagram regarding Russia's ban from international athletics that she was "totally not surprised about this outcome" and planned to compete under a neutral flag. "The only thing that confuses us is that the athletes are alone in their struggle, and the leaders of our sport all this time have been protecting us only in words," Lasitskene said. She denies the existence of state-sponsored doping in Russia, but puts the blame on the Russian officials for "insufficiently defending the Russian athletes against the West."

International competitions

Personal bests

Winning streak (45)
From 1 July 2016 to 30 June 2018 Lasitskene won 45 competitions in a row. On 13 July 2018, her streak was broken in Rabat, one of the IAAF Diamond League meetings, where she placed third.

 V All-Russian Summer Universiade – Smolensk, Russia (1.90 m)
 Russian Cup – Zhukovsky, Russia (2.00 m)
 Stars of 2016 – Moscow, Russia (1.88 m)
 Y. Lukashevich and V. Seredkin Memorial – Chelyabinsk, Russia (1.94 m, indoors)
 N. G. Ozolin and V. M. Dyachkov Memorial – Moscow, Russia (2.00 m, indoors)
 Governor Cup – Volgograd, Russia (1.95 m, indoors)
 Russian Winter Meeting – Moscow, Russia (1.91 m, indoors)
 Merited Master of the USSR V. I. Alekseev Memorial – Saint Petersburg, Russia (1.96 m, indoors)
 2017 Russian Indoor Athletics Championships – Moscow, Russia (2.03 m, indoors)
 Prefontaine Classic – Eugene, USA (2.03 m)
 12th Opole Festival of Jumpers – Opole, Poland (2.00 m)
 Golden Gala Pietro Mennea – Rome, Italy (2.00)
 FBK Games – Hengelo, Netherlands (2.04 m)
 Paavo Nurmi Games – Turku, Finland (1.95 m)
 V. M. Evstratov Memorial – Zhukovsky, Russia (1.97 m)
 Bauhaus-Galan – Stockholm, Sweden (2.00 m)
 Moscow Oblast Championships – Zhukovsky, Russia (2.00 m)
 Brothers Znamensky Memorial – Zhukovsky, Russia (1.95 m)
 Athletissima – Lausanne, Switzerland (2.06 m)
 Anniversary Games – London, Great Britain (2.00 m)
 Russian Cup – Yerino, Russia (2.01 m)
 Atletica Mondiale – Padova, Italy (2.00 m)
 Herculis – Monaco (2.05 m)
 2017 Russian Athletics Championships – Zhukovsky, Russia (1.96 m)
 2017 World Athletics Championships – London, Great Britain (2.03 m)
 Kamila Skolimowska Memorial – Warsaw, Poland (1.95 m)
 Memorial Van Damme – Brussels, Belgium (2.02 m)
 Christmas Starts – Minsk, Belarus (2.00 m, indoors)
 Y. Lukashevich and V. Seredkin Memorial – Chelyabinsk, Russia (1.95 m, indoors)
 N. G. Ozolin and V. M. Dyachkov Memorial – Moscow, Russia (2.01 m, indoors)
 Battle of the Sexes – Moscow, Russia (1.99 m, indoors)
 Stalingrad Cup – Volgograd, Russia (2.04 m, indoors)
 Banskobystricka latka – Banska Bystrica, Slovakia (2.02 m, indoors)
 Madrid Indoor – Madrid, Spain (2.00 m, indoors)
 2018 Russian Indoor Athletics Championships – Moscow, Russia (1.88 m, indoors)
 Copernicus Cup – Torun, Poland (2.00 m, indoors)
 Muller Indoor Grand Prix Glasgow – Glasgow, Scotland (1.95 m, indoors)
 2018 World Indoor Athletics Championships – Birmingham, Great Britain (2.01 m, indoors)
 Shanghai Golden Grand Prix – Shanghai, China (1.97 m)
 Golden Gala Pietro Mennea – Rome, Italy (2.02 m)
 FBK Games – Hengelo, Netherlands (2.03 m)
 Bauhaus-Galan – Stockholm, Sweden (2.00 m)
 Opole Festival of Jumpers – Opole, Poland (1.94 m)
 V. M. Evstratov Memorial – Zhukovsky, Russia (2.01 m)
 Meeting de Paris – Paris, France (2.04 m)

Personal life
Lasitskene was awarded the rank of senior lieutenant of the Russian Armed Forces after winning the 2017 IAAF World Championships.

Mariya married Russian sports journalist and Eurosport commentator of Lithuanian descent Vladas "Tashev" Lasitskas on 17 March 2017. She then took her husband's family name.

See also
Female two metres club
List of World Athletics Championships medalists (women)
List of IAAF World Indoor Championships medalists (women)
List of European Athletics Championships medalists (women)
List of European Athletics Indoor Championships medalists (women)
High jump at the World Championships in Athletics
Authorised Neutral Athletes at the World Athletics Championships

References

External links
 
 

1993 births
Living people
People from Prokhladny, Kabardino-Balkar Republic
Sportspeople from Kabardino-Balkaria
Russian female high jumpers
Universiade silver medalists for Russia
Universiade medalists in athletics (track and field)
Medalists at the 2013 Summer Universiade
Youth Olympic gold medalists for Russia
Youth Olympic gold medalists in athletics (track and field)
Athletes (track and field) at the 2010 Summer Youth Olympics
World Athletics Championships athletes for Russia
Authorised Neutral Athletes at the World Athletics Championships
World Athletics Championships medalists
World Athletics Championships winners
World Athletics Indoor Championships winners
IAAF Continental Cup winners
European Athletics Championships medalists
European Athletics Indoor Championships winners
Russian Athletics Championships winners
Diamond League winners
European Athletics Rising Star of the Year winners
Athletes (track and field) at the 2020 Summer Olympics
Olympic gold medalists for the Russian Olympic Committee athletes
Medalists at the 2020 Summer Olympics
Olympic gold medalists in athletics (track and field)
Olympic athletes of Russia